During the 1980s, most digital forensic investigations consisted of "live analysis", examining digital media directly using non-specialist tools. In the 1990s, several freeware and other proprietary tools (both hardware and software) were created to allow investigations to take place without modifying media. This first set of tools mainly focused on computer forensics, although in recent years similar tools have evolved for the field of mobile device forensics. This list includes notable examples of digital forensic tools.

Forensics-focused operating systems

Debian-based 
 Kali Linux is a Debian-derived Linux distribution designed for digital forensics and penetration testing, formerly known as BackTrack.

 Parrot Security OS is a cloud-oriented Linux distribution based on Debian and designed to perform security and penetration tests, do forensic analysis, or act in anonymity. It uses the MATE Desktop Environment, Linux Kernel 4.6 or higher and it is available as a live lightweight installable ISO image for 32-bit, 64-bit and ARM processors with forensic options at boot, optimizations for programmers, and new custom pentesting tools.

Ubuntu-based 
 CAINE Linux is an ubuntu-based live CD/DVD. CAINE stands for Computer Aided INvestigative Environment.

Pentoo-based 
 Pentoo Penetration Testing Overlay and Livecd is a live CD and Live USB designed for penetration testing and security assessment. Based on Gentoo Linux, Pentoo is provided both as 32-bit and 64-bit installable live CD. Pentoo also is available as an overlay for an existing Gentoo installation. It features packet injection patched wifi drivers, GPGPU cracking software, and many tools for penetration testing and security assessment. The Pentoo kernel includes grsecurity and PAX hardening and extra patches – with binaries compiled from a hardened toolchain with the latest nightly versions of some tools available.

Computer forensics

Memory forensics

Memory forensics tools are used to acquire or analyze a computer's volatile memory (RAM). They are often used in incident response situations to preserve evidence in memory that would be lost when a system is shut down, and to quickly detect stealthy malware by directly examining the operating system and other running software in memory.

Mobile device forensics

Mobile forensics tools tend to consist of both a hardware and software component. Mobile phones come with a diverse range of connectors, the hardware devices support a number of different cables and perform the same role as a write blocker in computer devices.

Software forensics

Software forensics is the science of analyzing software source code or binary code to determine whether intellectual property infringement or theft occurred. It is the centerpiece of lawsuits, trials, and settlements when companies are in dispute over issues involving software patents, copyrights, and trade secrets. Software forensics tools can compare code to determine correlation, a measure that can be used to guide a software forensics expert.

Other

See also 
 List of data recovery software

Digital forensics